The Dāya-Tattva is a Hindu law treatise written by Raghunandana regarding the proper procedure for inheritance following the death of the father.  It is considered by many to be a follow up text to Jīmūtavāhana's digest, the Dāyabhāga.  Raghunandana is considered to be a "disciple" of Jīmūtavāhana, and his texts subsequently differ only slightly from the Dāyabhāga.

Translation
 The Dāya-Tattva was translated by the famous Hindu jurist, Golapcandra Sarkar.

Topics covered in the digest
 Partitions made by the father
 Partition among brother's after their father's death
 Persons not entitled to a share
 Property not eligible for partition
 Inheritance procedure for one who dies without a son

Location

The Dāya-Tattva is followed in the Bengal region of India.  Raghunandana is considered by many to be one of Bengal's greatest jurists.

References

Hindu law
Sanskrit literature